The Huamalíes Province is one of eleven provinces of the Huánuco Region in Peru. The capital of this province is the city of Llata.

Boundaries
North: Huacaybamba Province
East: Leoncio Prado Province
South: Dos de Mayo Province
West: Ancash Region

Geography 
Some of the highest mountains of the province are listed below:

Political division
The province is divided into eleven districts, which are:

 Arancay (Arancay)
 Chavín de Pariarca (Chavín de Pariarca)
 Jacas Grande (Jacas Grande)
 Jircan (Jircan)
 Llata (Llata)
 Miraflores (Miraflores)
 Monzón (Monzón)
 Punchao (Punchao)
 Puños (Puños)
 Singa (Singa)
 Tantamayo (Tantamayo)

Ethnic groups 
The people in the province are mainly indigenous citizens of Quechua descent. Quechua is the language which the majority of the population (53.30%) learnt to speak in childhood, 46.23% of the residents started speaking using the Spanish language (2007 Peru Census).

Archaeology 
Some of the most important archaeological sites of the province are Anku, Awila Qhincha Mach'ay, Awkin Punta, Awqa Punta, Isuq, K'ipakhara, Miyu Pampa, Phiruru, Pumaq Hirka, Qillqay Mach'ay, Susupillu, Urpish, Wanqaran and Wat'a, some of which were declared a National Cultural Heritage.

See also 
 Kinwaqucha
 Qarwaqucha
 Wiqruqucha
 Yanaqucha

References 

Provinces of the Huánuco Region